The Banking (Special Provisions) Act 2008 (c 2) is an Act of the Parliament of the United Kingdom that entered into force on the 21 February 2008 in order to enable the UK government to nationalise high-street banks under emergency circumstances by secondary legislation. The Act was introduced in order to nationalise the failing bank Northern Rock after the bank was supported by Bank of England credit and a private-sector solution was deemed "not to provide sufficient value for the taxpayer" by the UK government.

Opposition to the Act by the Conservatives was based on: the Bill providing an exemption to the Freedom of Information Act 2000, the large liabilities to the taxpayer and the alleged lack of independence from the government. The Bill was also sufficiently widely drawn to allow the nationalisation of any financial institution, leading to the concern that other banks might be in financial difficulty.

After the nationalisation of Northern Rock, the Act allowed for the nationalisation of the mortgage and personal loan book of Bradford & Bingley on 29 September 2008.

On 8 October 2008, the Treasury announced that an order under the Act was being used to transfer all retail deposits with Heritable Bank, a UK-based banking subsidiary of the failing Icelandic bank Landsbanki, and Kaupthing Edge to ING Direct. However section 2(8) of the Act provides that the Treasury may only make Transfer Orders under the Act for a maximum of a year after its passage. The Act therefore expired on 21 February 2009, when it was superseded by the Banking Act 2009.

List of banks acquired/transferred under the Act

See also

 2008 United Kingdom bank rescue package

References

External links 
The Banking (Special Provisions) Act 2008, as amended from the National Archives.
The Banking (Special Provisions) Act 2008, as originally enacted from the National Archives.
Explanatory notes to the Banking (Special Provisions) Act 2008.
 History of the passage of the bill through parliament

United Kingdom Acts of Parliament 2008
Great Recession in the United Kingdom
2008 in economics
Banking legislation in the United Kingdom